Expedition 40 was the 40th expedition to the International Space Station. A portion of the Expedition 39 crew transferred to Expedition 40 while the remainder of the crew launched on May 28, 2014 from Baikonur Cosmodrome in Kazakhstan. 

Upon achieving orbit approximately nine minutes after launch, Soyuz TMA-13M, delivering the remainder of the crew, began a four-orbit rendezvous with the International Space Station. Soyuz TMA-13M subsequently docked with the Rassvet module of the ISS at 1:44 UTC on May 29. Hatches were opened between the two spacecraft just over two hours later at 3:52 UTC. The expedition ended with the undocking of Soyuz TMA-12M on September 10, 2014. The remainder of Expedition 40's crew joined Expedition 41.

Crew

Source ESA

Mobile Servicing System
The Mobile Servicing System is a robotic system onboard the ISS used for assembly and maintenance. During Expedition 40, it was used the replace a broken camera on the system's mobile base with a deteriorated but functional camera from the arm, and to in turn place a new camera on the arm. This marked the first self-repair by a robot in space, and is likely to result in reduced need for time consuming and dangerous space walks.

References

External links

 NASA's Space Station Expeditions page

Expeditions to the International Space Station
2014 in spaceflight